The Linda Lindas are a rock band from Los Angeles. The all-girl group comprises Bela Salazar, Eloise Wong, Lucia de la Garza, and Mila de la Garza.

History
In January 2018, Eloise Wong's father Martin Wong was contacted by an acquaintance, asking if she would be interested in playing alongside Kristin Kontrol and a bunch of "inexperienced kids" for a performance at a music festival called Girlschool LA, after seeing pictures and videos of her singing at Save Music in Chinatown. Martin then suggested Lucia and Mila de la Garza, daughters of his sister Angelyn Wong and brother-in-law Carlos de la Garza, since the three of them often sang, danced and performed together since they were toddlers; Carlos, who owned a backyard studio, took up the position of a second coach. After Kontrol recruited more children through social media and the first round of rehearsals were held, Angelyn and Martin's wife Wendy Lau reached out to the girls' family friend Bela Salazar, who was taking guitar lessons, to join in, thinking that they needed someone who could play an instrument. Originally, it was intended to be a one-off project, but a few months later, Salazar was invited to open a show for Frieda's Roses, and engaged Eloise, Lucia and Mila to be her backing band.

Feeling that the band needed a name, Martin, who had bought a DVD of 2005 Japanese film Linda Linda Linda, (in turn named after the Blue Hearts song "Linda Linda"), suggested The Linda Lindas, feeling that it "sounded like a band from the '50s but could also refer to the Japanese punk song or art movie, or simply mean 'really pretty' in Spanish", to which the girls agreed. By fall, they were playing Save Music in Chinatown matinee gigs alongside artists such as Phranc, the Dils, the Gears, and the Alley Cats, and other shows with bands such as Best Coast, Alice Bag, and Bleached.

After Amy Poehler watched the Linda Lindas open for Bikini Kill on April 26, 2019, at the Hollywood Palladium, she had them record songs for her film Moxie. In 2020, the Linda Lindas wrote a song for Netflix documentary The Claudia Kishi Club, titled "Claudia Kishi", after the Japanese-American character in Ann M. Martin's novel series The Baby-Sitters Club.

In May 2021, the Los Angeles Public Library posted a video of the band playing "Racist, Sexist Boy" at a "TEENtastic Tuesdays" event. The song was about an experience Mila, the band's drummer, had when a schoolmate made a racist comment before the COVID-19 pandemic. The video became a viral social media hit, earning praise from Rage Against the Machine's Tom Morello, Red Hot Chili Peppers's Flea, Thurston Moore, Bikini Kill's Kathleen Hanna, Kid Cudi, and author Viet Thanh Nguyen, who said, "'Racist, Sexist Boy' is the song we need now".

On May 22, 2021, Epitaph Records announced that it had signed the Linda Lindas.

On June 3, 2021, the band made their late night television debut on Jimmy Kimmel Live.

On July 21, 2021, the band released the single "Oh!" with an accompanying music video. The song also was featured in the trailer released for the Netflix series The Chair, which was released that same day. The song was also played for the outro of series 1 episode 5 of The Imperfects.

On February 1, 2022, the band announced their release date of their debut album, Growing Up, alongside the release of the single of the same name. Growing Up was released on April 8, 2022 to generally positive reviews. The track 'Racist, Sexist Boy' was nominated for Best Song at the 2022 Kerrang! Awards.

Band members
The band consists of Eloise (bass, guitars, vocals), Bela (guitars, vocals), Lucia (guitar, vocals), and Mila (drums, vocals). Bela is the oldest member at 18 , and Mila the youngest, at 12. Lucia and Mila are daughters of music engineer and producer Carlos de la Garza, and Eloise's father is Martin Wong, co-founder of Giant Robot. The band members' stage names, birth dates, and roles are as follows:

Discography

Studio albums

Extended plays

Singles

References

External links

 The Linda Lindas: Growing Up Album Review by Cultura

 
 
 'I’m so glad you guys exist!' Carrie Brownstein meets the Linda Lindas

2018 establishments in California
All-female punk bands
American power pop groups
Asian American music
Child rock musicians
Epitaph Records artists
Latin American music
Musical groups from Los Angeles
Musical groups established in 2018
Pop punk groups from California
Punk rock groups from California